Samuel Jackson Swartz (February 8, 1859 – March 25, 1905) was the 33rd mayor of Columbus, Ohio and the 30th person to serve in that office.   He served Columbus for one term.  His successor, John N. Hinkle, took office in 1901.

References

Bibliography

Further reading

External links

Samuel Jackson Swartz at Political Graveyard

Mayors of Columbus, Ohio
1859 births
1905 deaths
Ohio Republicans
People from Fairfield County, Ohio
Ohio Wesleyan University alumni
Burials at Green Lawn Cemetery (Columbus, Ohio)